Suppasek Kaikaew (born December 12, 1986), formerly Pakin Kaikaew or Ubon Kaikaew, is a Thai professional footballer who plays as an attacking midfielder for Sakon Nakhon.

International career

In October 2014, Suppasek debuted for Thailand against China.

International

Honours

Clubs
Chonburi
 Thai FA Cup: 2010

Bangkok Glass
 Thai FA Cup: 2014

References

External links
 Profile at Goal

1986 births
Living people
Suppasek Kaikaew
Suppasek Kaikaew
Association football midfielders
Suppasek Kaikaew
Suppasek Kaikaew
Suppasek Kaikaew
Suppasek Kaikaew
Suppasek Kaikaew
Suppasek Kaikaew